Siris may refer to:

Mythology
Siris (goddess), the Mesopotamian goddess of beer
Siris (mythology), a figure in Greek mythology; also known as Sinis

Places
Siris, Magna Graecia, an ancient city in southern Italy
Siris, Sardinia, an Italian commune
Sinni (river), Italy
Siris, Jenin, a Palestinian town
Serres, a city in Macedonia called Siris by the Ancient Greek historian Herodotus

People
Michael Siris (born 1945), American attorney
P. Siris (1705–1735), English dancing master and choreographer

Other uses
Albizia or Siris, plants in the legume genus, also known as silk trees
Siris (band), an international rock group
Smithsonian Institution Research Information System (SIRIS)
The main character from the Infinity Blade series of games
A 1744 treatise on natural philosophy by Irish philosopher George Berkeley

See also

Siri (disambiguation)
Sirius (disambiguation)